Tebeau is a surname. It may refer to:

Charlton W. Tebeau (1904–2000), American historian
George Tebeau (1861–1923), American baseball player, outfielder in Major League Baseball
Patsy Tebeau (1864–1918), American baseball player, first baseman, third baseman, and manager in Major League Baseball
Pussy Tebeau (1870–1950),American baseball player, right fielder in Major League Baseball 
William Tebeau (1925–2013), in 1948 became the first African-American man to graduate from Oregon State College